Last order date (LOD) is the date before which customers can buy a product. After this date, its mainstream support has been ended. This is part of the product lifecycle as specified in JEDEC standards.

See also
 Product change notification
 End-of-life (product)
 End of life announcement

References

Product lifecycle management
Software release